Percival Roy Ivan Player (born 10 May 1928 in Portsmouth, Hampshire, England - died 1992), was an English footballer who played as a centre half in the Football League. He came to the attention of Grimsby Town while serving in the locality with the RAF, and signed professional forms in 1953. In five years with the club he made a total of 57 appearances, before transferring to Oldham Athletic in 1959. In his one season at Boundary Park he made just two appearances before moving into non-league football in August 1960 when he joined Gainsborough Trinity.

References

External links

1928 births
1992 deaths
English footballers
Footballers from Portsmouth
Association football defenders
Portsmouth F.C. players
Grimsby Town F.C. players
Oldham Athletic A.F.C. players
Gainsborough Trinity F.C. players
Spalding United F.C. players
English Football League players